Ben Phillips (born 1947) is an American-born Canadian poet, teacher and publisher.

Biography
Born in the United States, where he worked as a journalist, he settled in Toronto, Ontario in 1968. In Toronto he has owned and operated two antiquarian bookshops, established The Folks Upstairs Press and taught English as a second language (ESL) to students and professionals from Japan and South Korea.

Literary activities
Editor and co-founder of The Folks Upstairs Press. His poetry and essays have appeared in
Canadian Author & Bookman, Catalyst (USA), North York Arts Council News, Pierian Spring, Poetry Toronto, Rolling Stone (USA), Midway Review (USA), Poetry W.L.U., Tower, West Coast Review, Watchwords, Waterways (USA) and many other periodicals.

Published works
1970:Flesh Candle, FUP Press, Toronto, 
1977:Notes From Nowhere, The Folks Upstairs Press, Toronto, 
 1983:The Dead Leave Holes, Unfinished Monument Press, Toronto, Libraries this book has an entry in:
• National Library of Canada (last modified on 23 January 2008)
1984:Watching The Gibbous Moon, Pierian Press, Brandon, Manitoba,

Anthologies
1983:The Toronto Collection, An Anthology of the New Toronto Poets, edited by Leslie Nutting, Manoeuvres Press, 
1984:Other Channels, An Anthology of New Canadian Poetry, edited by Shaunt Basmajian & Jones, League of Canadian Poets Associates,

References

External links
Library: National Library of Canada/ The dead leave holes Ben Phillips Publisher: Toronto : Unfinished Monument Press, c1983. Edition: $2,00 https://web.archive.org/web/20110604101318/http://isbndb.com/d/book/the_dead_leave_holes/library/167.html

Living people
1947 births
20th-century Canadian poets
Canadian male poets
20th-century Canadian male writers